The 2023 NextEra Energy 250 was the 1st stock car race of the 2023 NASCAR Craftsman Truck Series, and the 24th iteration of the event. The race was held on Friday, February 17, 2023, in Daytona Beach, Florida, at Daytona International Speedway, a  permanent tri-oval shaped superspeedway. The race was scheduled to be contested over 100 laps, but was shortened to 79 laps due to rain. Zane Smith, the reigning winner of the race, driving for Front Row Motorsports, would win the race after leading when the final caution came out for rain. This was Smith's eighth career NASCAR Craftsman Truck Series win, and his first of the season. To fill out the podium, Tanner Gray, driving for TRICON Garage, and Christian Eckes, driving for McAnally-Hilgemann Racing, would finish 2nd and 3rd, respectively.

Background 
Daytona International Speedway is one of three superspeedways to hold NASCAR races, the other two being Atlanta Motor Speedway and Talladega Superspeedway. The track's turns are banked at 31 degrees, while the front stretch, the location of the finish line, is banked at 18 degrees.

Entry list 

 (R) denotes rookie driver.
 (i) denotes driver who is ineligible for series driver points.

Practice 
The first and only practice session was held on Thursday, February 16, at 5:05 PM EST, and would last for 50 minutes.

Qualifying 
Qualifying was held on Friday, February 17, at 3:00 PM EST. Since Daytona International Speedway is a superspeedway, the qualifying system used is a single-car, single-lap system with two rounds. In the first round, drivers have one lap to set a time. The fastest ten drivers from the first round move on to the second round. Whoever sets the fastest time in Round 2 wins the pole.

Six drivers would fail to qualify: Lawless Alan, Bryan Dauzat, Todd Peck, Spencer Boyd, Kaden Honeycutt, and Norm Benning.

Race results 
Stage 1 Laps: 20

Stage 2 Laps: 20

Stage 3 Laps: 39

Standings after the race 

Drivers' Championship standings

Note: Only the first 10 positions are included for the driver standings.

References 

NASCAR races at Daytona International Speedway
NextEra Energy 250
NextEra Energy 250